During the 2004–05 English football season, Portsmouth competed in the FA Premier League. It was Portsmouth's second consecutive season in English football's top-flight.

Season summary
Portsmouth's campaign got off to a good start, winning four of their first ten games including the famous, brilliant 2–0 win over Manchester United as they maintained a strong mid-table position in late October. However, manager Harry Redknapp walked out on Portsmouth in November after a row with chairman Milan Mandaric over the appointment of new Director of Football Velimir Zajec at the club. Zajec replaced Redknapp as manager with immediate effect, but under his management the club's form dipped, bringing the club from the top ten to a few points above the relegation zone. In April, Zajec was replaced by Frenchman Alain Perrin; Perrin managed to secure Portsmouth's Premiership status with a few games of the season left. Despite this, Portsmouth still played a pivotal role in the "Survival Sunday" relegation drama - by losing 2–0 at West Bromwich Albion they both secured Albion's Premiership status and helped relegate arch-rivals Southampton (although Southampton were beaten 2–1 at home by Manchester United and would have been relegated even if Albion had lost).

Final league table

Kit
Portsmouth retained the previous season's kit, manufactured under the club's own brand, Pompey Sport.

First-team squad
Squad at end of season

Left club during season

Statistics

Reserve squad

Transfers

In
  Andy Griffin -  Newcastle United, free, 26 May 2004 
  Jamie Ashdown -  Reading, June 2004, undisclosed
  David Unsworth -  Everton, free, 12 July 2004
  Lomana LuaLua -  Newcastle United, undisclosed (estimated £1,750,000), 12 July 2004
  Andrea Guatelli -  Fiorenzuola, free, 2 August 2004
  Aliou Cissé -  Birmingham City, £300,000, 6 August 2004
  Ricardo Fuller -  Preston North End, £1,000,000, 20 August 2004
  Diomansy Kamara -  Modena, £2,500,000, 30 August 2004
  Valéry Mézague -  Montpellier, season loan, 31 August 2004
  Giannis Skopelitis -  Egaleo, 28 January 2005, season loan with option of making permanent, £300,000 rising to £1,000,000 if made permanent
  Kostas Chalkias -  Panathinaikos, 28 January 2005, nominal fee
  Aleksander Rodić -  NK Gorica, 31 January 2005, undisclosed

Out
  Tim Sherwood -  Coventry City, free, 9 July 2004
  Teddy Sheringham  West Ham United, free, 14 July 2004 
  Deon Burton -  Brentford, undisclosed, 16 July 2004 (officially joined 1 August)
  Ivica Mornar -  Rennes, season loan, 8 August 2004
  Eddie Howe -  AFC Bournemouth, free, 12 November 2004
  Lewis Buxton -  Stoke City, 24 December 2004 
  Anthony Pulis -  Stoke City, 24 December 2004
  John Curtis -  Nottingham Forest, free, January 2005
  Nigel Quashie -  Southampton, £2,100,000, 17 January 2005
  Amdy Faye -  Newcastle United, £2,000,000, 23 January 2005
  Kevin Harper -  Stoke City, undisclosed, 1 February 2005
  Eyal Berkovic -  Maccabi Tel Aviv, 4 February 2005
  David Unsworth -  Ipswich Town, four-month loan, 15 February 2005
  Alan Knight - retired, 2004
  Warren Hunt -  Fareham Town, 2004
  Sebastian Olszar -  Polonia Warsaw, 2004
  Carl Robinson -  Sunderland, 2004
  Sébastien Schemmel -  Le Havre, December 2004
  Harald Wapenaar -  Vitesse Arnhem, 2005
  Rowan Vine -  Luton Town, loan, 2004
  Mark Burchill -  Hearts, loan

Transfers in:  £5,750,000
Transfers out:  £4,100,000
Total spending:  £1,650,000

Results

Premiership

FA Cup
 Third round: Portsmouth 1-0 Gillingham (Yakubu 49)
 Fourth round: Southampton 2-1 Portsmouth (Oakley 54, Crouch 90 pen.; Yakubu 57 pen.)

League Cup
 Second round: Tranmere Rovers 0-1 Portsmouth (Kamara 65)
 Third round: Portsmouth 2-1 Leeds United (Kamara 14, Berkovic 32 pen.; Deane 40)
 Fourth round: Cardiff City 0-2 Portsmouth (Yakubu 47, 55 pen.)
 Quarter-finals: Watford 3-0 Portsmouth (Helguson 24, 57, Dyer 61)

References

Portsmouth F.C. seasons
Portsmouth